The 2021 ISSF Junior World Championships was held in Lima, Peru for Rifle, Pistol, and Shotgun from 27 September to 10 October 2021.

Results

Men 

Individual Competition

Women 

Individual Competition

Mixed

Medal table 
Source:

References 

Junior
ISSF Junior World Championships
International sports competitions hosted by Peru
ISSF Junior World Championships
Shooting competitions in Peru
ISSF
ISSF